Duan Xiquan is a Chinese Olympic middle-distance runner. He represented his country in the men's 1500 meters and the men's 800 meters at the 1988 Summer Olympics. His time was a 1:52.17 in the 800, and a 3:44.88 in the 1500 heats.

References

1967 births
Living people
Chinese male middle-distance runners
Olympic athletes of China
Athletes (track and field) at the 1988 Summer Olympics